On Tuesday, 6 May 2014, at least six people were injured in a knife attack in Guangzhou, China. At least one suspect was shot and detained by authorities. It was believed by some witnesses that about four suspects were involved, they were clad in white clothes, wearing white caps and were carrying large knives.

References

2014 crimes in China
Crime in Guangzhou
Mass stabbings in China
History of Guangzhou
Knife attacks
Events in Guangzhou